Stefania Strumillo (born 14 October 1989) is an Italian athlete specialising in the discus throw.

Biography
She won the bronze medal at the 2015 Summer Universiade. Her personal best in the event is 59.80 metres set in Amsterdam in 2016.

Achievements

National titles
Strumillo won sixnational championships at individual senior level.

Italian Athletics Championships
Shot put: 2015, 2016, 2017, 2019 (4)
Italian Winter Throwing Championships
Discus throw: 2015, 2021 (2)

See also
Italian all-time lists - Discus throw

References

External links

1989 births
Living people
Italian female discus throwers
Universiade medalists in athletics (track and field)
Sportspeople from the Province of Ferrara
Universiade bronze medalists for Italy
Italian Athletics Championships winners
Competitors at the 2017 Summer Universiade
Medalists at the 2015 Summer Universiade
21st-century Italian women
Athletes (track and field) at the 2022 Mediterranean Games